Herbert Rolland Percy (August 6, 1920 – December 17, 1996) was a British-born Canadian writer. He was best known for his novel Painted Ladies, a shortlisted nominee for the Governor General's Award for English-language fiction at the 1983 Governor General's Awards.

Born in Burham, Kent, England, Percy served for much of his working life in the Royal Navy and the Royal Canadian Navy. He published his first volume of short stories, The Timeless Island, in 1960, and concentrated more extensively on writing after his retirement from the navy in 1971 with the rank of lieutenant commander.

In addition to novels and short stories, he also published biographies of Joseph Howe and Thomas Chandler Haliburton, and was an editor of Canadian Author and Bookman, the trade magazine of the Canadian Authors Association.

He died in 1996.

Works
The Timeless Island (1960)
Joseph Howe (1976)
Flotsam (1978)
Thomas Chandler Haliburton (1980)
Painted Ladies (1983)
A Model Lover (1986)
Tranter's Tree (1987)
An Innocent Bystander (1989)
The Mother Tongue (1992)

References

1920 births
1996 deaths
Canadian male novelists
20th-century Canadian novelists
Canadian male short story writers
Canadian biographers
Male biographers
Writers from Nova Scotia
People from Tonbridge and Malling (district)
British emigrants to Canada
Royal Canadian Navy personnel
20th-century biographers
20th-century Canadian short story writers
20th-century Canadian male writers
Canadian male non-fiction writers